Yu Guang (born October 1958) is a lieutenant general in the People's Liberation Army of China who served as deputy political commissar of the People's Liberation Army Rocket Force from 2018 to 2021.

He was an alternate member of the 19th Central Committee of the Chinese Communist Party.

Biography
Yu was born in the town of Tuanshan, Shaodong County (now Shaodong), Hunan, in October 1958. He served in the People's Liberation Army General Political Department for a long time. In December 2014, he was appointed head of the Publicity Division of the People's Liberation Army General Political Department, succeeding . He was promoted to assistant director of the Political Work Department of the Central Military Commission in January 2016, and was promoted again to deputy director in July 2017. One year later, he was commissioned as deputy political commissar of the People's Liberation Army Rocket Force.

He was promoted to the rank of major general (shaojiang) in December 2011 and lieutenant general (zhongjiang) in July 2018.

References

1958 births
Living people
People from Shaodong
People's Liberation Army generals from Hunan
People's Republic of China politicians from Hunan
Chinese Communist Party politicians from Hunan
Alternate members of the 19th Central Committee of the Chinese Communist Party